The PS William Randell is a restored paddle steamer located at Hindmarsh Island.

References

External links
 http://www.murrayriver.com.au/about-the-murray/murray-paddlesteamers/
 http://www.slimpage.com.au/pbnold/reports/sep2011.html
 https://web.archive.org/web/20150108141552/https://www.woodenboatfestival.com.au/paddles.php
 https://www.flickr.com/photos/39371441@N07/6849428670/?rb=1

Paddle steamers of Australia